Senyumia is a genus of flowering plants belonging to the family Gesneriaceae.

Its native range is Malaysian Peninsula.

Species
Species:

Senyumia granitica 
Senyumia minutiflora

References

Didymocarpoideae
Gesneriaceae genera